Yevgeny Alekseyevich Barilovich (30 October 1932 – 5 March 2020) was an officer of the  Soviet Navy. Part of the submarine branch, he rose to command his own vessels, reaching the rank of captain 1st rank. In 1979 he was awarded the title of Hero of the Soviet Union.

Career
Barilovich was born on 30 October 1932 in Moscow, then part of the Russian Soviet Socialist Federative Republic, in the Soviet Union. He took ten classes of schooling, and after graduating from the Saratov Naval Preparatory School in 1951, entered the Soviet Navy.

Barilovich's service was rewarded on 10 January 1979 by a decree of the Presidium of the Supreme Soviet awarding him the title of Hero of the Soviet Union, with the concurrent award of the Order of Lenin and gold star. The award, for "courage and heroism in the performance of military duty", was number 11425. He also received the Order of the Red Banner during his time in service.

He died on 5 March 2020, with his death was reported on 11 March 2020 in Krasnaya Zvezda, the news outlet of the Russian Ministry of Defence. He was buried in the Federal Military Memorial Cemetery.

References

1932 births
2020 deaths
Military personnel from Moscow
Soviet Navy officers
Soviet submarine commanders
Heroes of the Soviet Union
Recipients of the Order of Lenin
Recipients of the Order of the Red Banner
Communist Party of the Soviet Union members
Burials at the Federal Military Memorial Cemetery